Andrzej Stanisław Kremer (8 August 1961 in Kraków – 10 April 2010) was a Polish lawyer and diplomat, the Deputy Minister of Foreign Affairs of Poland.

He was listed on the flight  of the Tupolev Tu-154 of the 36th Special Aviation Regiment carrying the President of Poland Lech Kaczyński which crashed near Smolensk-North airport near Pechersk near Smolensk, Russia, on 10 April 2010, killing all aboard.

Honours and awards
Commander's Cross of the Order of Polonia Restituta - 2010, posthumously
Bene Merito Badge of Honour - 2000, posthumously
Chevalier of the Order of Merit, Stage III - 2009, Ukraine

References

1961 births
2010 deaths
Burials at Rakowicki Cemetery
Lawyers from Kraków
Diplomats from Kraków
Victims of the Smolensk air disaster
Commanders of the Order of Polonia Restituta
Chevaliers of the Order of Merit (Ukraine)
Jagiellonian University alumni